, is a Japanese manga series written and illustrated by Yoshito Usui. Crayon Shin-chan made its first appearance in 1990 in a Japanese weekly magazine called Weekly Manga Action, which was published by Futabasha. Due to the death of author Yoshito Usui, the manga in its original form ended on September 11, 2009. A new manga began in the summer of 2010 by members of Usui's team, titled .

Celebrating its 30th consecutive year on air in 2022, an animated television adaptation began airing on TV Asahi in 1992 and is still ongoing on several television networks worldwide and has over 1000 episodes. The show has been dubbed in 30 languages which aired in 45 countries.

Synopsis

Set in Kasukabe, Saitama Prefecture, Japan, the series follows the adventures of the five-year-old Shinnosuke "Shin" Nohara and his parents, baby sister, dog, neighbours, and best friends. Most of the plot is about Shin-chan's daily life, but it is also often interspersed with a lot of fantastic and incredible elements.

Many of the jokes in the series stem from Shin-chan's occasionally weird, unnatural and inappropriate use of language, as well as from his mischievous behaviour. Consequently, non-Japanese readers and some viewers may find it difficult to understand his jokes. Some gags may require an understanding of Japanese culture and/or language to be fully appreciated; for example, his "Mr. Elephant" impression, while being transparently obvious as a physical gag, also has a deeper resonance with contemporary Japanese culture since it refers to the popular Japanese children's song "Zou-san" (ぞうさん). But after modest translation, it is popular in the rest of Asia due to cultural compatibility. It also contains many sarcastic jokes and stereotype humor.

The series is mainly in comedy style with a lot of sexual innuendo. However due to its popularity, it's also stylistically as family-friendly as possible, although it may not apply to anywhere. Most of episodes are about the importance of family and friends. On rare occasions, it also has some darker episodes like Miss Matsuzaka's boyfriend passing away in the manga, due to this circumstance it was not adapted into an anime episode.It also includes several horror adaption for example "The Line of no End", "The Horrible Elevator", "The Kindergarten Stairs", etc.

Shin-chan regularly becomes besotted with pretty female characters who are much older than him, and an additional source of humor is derived from his childlike attempts at wooing these characters, such as by asking them (inappropriately, on several levels) "Do you like green peppers?" (ピーマン好き?) (because he hates green peppers so much). He continually displays a lack of tact when talking to adults, asking questions such as "How many times did you go to the police?" to tough-looking men or "How old are you?" to elderly people. He is often shown with bare buttocks to emphasize the nonsensical jokes.

Media

Manga

Crayon Shin-chan, written and illustrated by Yoshito Usui, debuted in Futabasha's seinen manga magazine Weekly Manga Action in 1990. It started as a spin-off of the character Shinnosuke Nikaido (二階堂信之介) of another series by Yoshito Usui, Darakuya Store Monogatari (だらくやストア物語). The chapters were collected into 50 tankōbon volumes, which were published under Futabasha's Action Comics imprint, from April 11, 1992, to July 10, 2010.

Yoshito Usui died on September 11, 2009, after a fall at Mount Arafune. After Usui died, Futabasha originally planned to end Crayon Shin-chan in November 2009. Upon discovering new manuscripts, Futabasha decided to extend the comic's run until the March 2010 issue of the magazine, which shipped on February 5, 2010. Although the series formally ended on February 5, 2010, it was announced on December 1, 2009, that a new manga would begin in the summer of 2010 by members of Usui's team, titled .

A series of four bilingual Japanese-English manga were released in 1996 in Japan as Shin-chan: The Little Horror! (クレヨンしんちゃんの楽しいゾ英会話).

ComicsOne translated ten volumes of Crayon Shin-chan into English and released it in the United States of America. Occasional pop culture references familiar to Americans, such as Pokémon and Britney Spears, were added to increase the appeal to American audiences. The manga is mirrored from its original to read from left to right. Starting with the sixth volume, many of the names were changed to the ones used in the Vitello and Phuuz English version of the anime, even though the dub never aired in North America. This translation is rated Teen.

Since then, American publisher DrMaster took over the licenses of several manga series, including Crayon Shin-chan, from ComicsOne. No new volumes of Crayon Shin-chan were released under the DrMaster imprint.

On July 28, 2007, DC Comics' manga division CMX announced the acquisition of the Crayon Shin-chan manga. The CMX version is rated Mature instead of Teen from ComicsOne, because of nudity, sexual humor, dirty and bad language. The first volume was released on February 27, 2008, with uncensored art, and the style of jokes that frequent the Adult Swim dub with some throw backs to the original version, such as his original greeting. However, volume 10 omitted a gag which was in the ComicsOne version.

On April 11, 2012, One Peace Books announced their release of the manga, which is a reprint of the CMX version, in an omnibus format. Three omnibus volumes were released simultaneously on October 15, 2012. Volume 4 was released on November 13, 2013, and included the Japanese volume 12, marking the first time that particular volume has an English translation.

The Crayon Shin-chan manga spin-off, Action Mask, is currently available as read-only/print-only subscription from Crunchyroll and Futabasha. The main Shin-chan manga is also available from Crunchyroll using the CMX version, concurrently up to volume 10.

Anime

An anime adaptation of Crayon Shin-chan, produced by Shin-Ei Animation, has aired in Japan on TV Asahi since April 13, 1992. The series was originally directed by Mitsuru Hongo from 1992 to 1996, and was replaced by Keiichi Hara from 1996 to 2004. Since 2004, the series is directed by Yuji Muto. The music in the series is composed by Toshiyuki Arakawa. The series was originally going to end in 1994 and have its time-slot replaced by a remake of Umeboshi Denka. However, because the series was a huge hit on TV Asahi, the network decided not to replace it.

An English subtitled version of Crayon Shin-chan ran on KIKU in Hawaii from December 18, 1993, until December 2001 when Vitello Productions acquired the rights. The episodes were translated by Karlton Tomomitsu.

Spin-offs 
A spin-off series called Crayon Shin-chan Gaiden consisting of four seasons is exclusively streaming on Amazon Prime Video worldwide with English, German, Spanish, French, Italian and Portuguese subtitles. An anime spin-off series titled Super Shiro was announced on February 3, 2019. The spin-off focuses on Shin-chan's dog Shiro. The series was directed by Masaaki Yuasa and animated at Science SARU. Kimiko Ueno handled series composition, while Tomohisa Shimoyama served as chief director. TV Asahi, Shin-Ei Animation, ADK EM, and Futabasha produced the anime. The series ran for 48 episodes, with each episode being five minutes long.  The series premiered on October 14, 2019, on AbemaTV. An English dub premiered on Cartoon Network in Australia and Southeast Asia.

Crossovers
A special crossover series titled ''Kamen Rider Fourze x Crayon Shin-chan'' was aired in April 2012 featuring Shin-chan and Kamen Rider Fourze to promote Crayon Shin-chan: Fierceness That Invites Storm! Me and the Space Princess. On 2016 an animated crossover episode with Godzilla was broadcast in Japan. The character Sanrio from Hello Kitty appeared in the first Reiwa-era episode of Crayon Shin-chan.

International releases 
The series was first dubbed into English by Vitello Productions in Burbank, California through 2001–2002, when TV Asahi and Lacey Entertainment decided to market the series worldwide. During the early 2000s, it ran on Fox Kids (and later Jetix) in the United Kingdom, on Fox Kids in Australia, on Channel i in Singapore and on RTÉ Two in the Republic of Ireland. Subtitled versions also aired on Stöd 2 in Iceland and on Arutz HaYeladim in Israel. RTÉ Two has not shown the series since 2005, and on Jetix UK, the series was eventually relegated to shorts in-between programs, as a slot-filler. The dub is of American origin, with veteran voice actors such as Kath Soucie, Russi Taylor, Grey DeLisle, Pat Fraley, Eric Loomis and Anndi McAfee playing the characters. Soucie voiced Shin and Misae.

In 2003, Phuuz entertainment inc. was commissioned by Lacey Entertainment to continue in similar style as the Vitello dub. But their episodes featured a new cast of voice artists (among others Diane Michelle, Julie Maddalena, Peter Doyle).

52 episodes have been produced of the Vitello dub and 52 episodes of the Phuuz dub. Vitello and Phuuz episodes lasted on an average 21 minutes and contained three segments of 5 to 7 minutes. Some of the dubs of the series used the Vitello dub as the source for the dubbing. Some dubs also dubbed the Phuuz dub afterwards.

Funimation acquired the Shin-chan North America license in 2006. As per all international licenses for the series, TV Asahi remained a licensing partner for North America.

Funimation's version features a Texas-based cast of voice actors. Funimation's dub takes many liberties with the source material and was heavily Americanized. Similar to the Vitello dub, episodes of the series were dubbed out of their original order, and segments were reordered. Additionally, many characters had their names changed to American-sounding ones. Many sexual references, dark humor, and references to current popular American culture were added. For example, in one scene, Ai and Penny argue over which one of them is Jessica Simpson (whose first album was not released until 1999) and which one is Ashlee Simpson (whose first album was not released until 2004), which is very different from the original Japanese script that dealt with many social issues within Japan at the time. At least two episodes reference Rudy Giuliani and his unsuccessful bid for president.

New, previously non-existent backstories were created, as well as significantly different personalities for the characters. For instance, the unseen father of Nene (known in the dub as "Penny") was suggested to be physically abusive toward both his wife and daughter, and this was used as a source of black humor. Principal Enchou was rewritten as a half-Peruvian, half-Romani man with a complicated prior life that includes a stint as a magician, in which he accidentally injured scores of audience members. Ageo-sensei (known in the dub as "Miss Polly"), Shinnosuke's teacher, was rewritten as a kinky nymphomaniac, while Shin's schoolmate, Kazama, (known in the dub as "Georgie") was portrayed as a hawkish young Republican.

The first 52 episodes of the dub aired on Adult Swim. All three seasons, 26 episodes per season, have also been released on DVD. Season 3, released in 2011, culminated in the official finale, effectively ending the Funimation series.

A fourth English dub of Crayon Shin-chan has been produced in Hong Kong by Red Angel Media in 2015 and was commissioned by LUK Internacional, the company that produces the Spanish, Portuguese, the second Italian and the second French dubs of Crayon Shin-chan and commissioned the Doraemon dub that aired on Boomerang UK. The dub was translated from LUK Internacional's Spanish dub, which is close to the Japanese original and has no censorship. The first three volumes of the dub were released in the European and South African Nintendo 3DS eShop on December 22, 2016, and the fourth and fifth volumes were released on December 29, 2016. The dub is separated into five volumes, with the first volume being free while the other four cost €1.99/£1.79. The first volume contains two episodes while the other four contain 6 episodes each which makes 26 episodes in total.

In the Philippines, IBC 13 aired a Filipino dub of the anime in the early 2000s with Shinnosuke being voiced by Filipino rapper Andrew E.

In India, Hindi dubs of the anime started airing on Hungama TV on June 19, 2006, Later also started in Tamil dub and Telugu dub. Only 13 films of have been dubbed in Hindi, Tamil and Telugu and have aired on Hungama TV.

Music

Openings
Lyricist: Yoshito Usui / Composer: Tetsurō Oda / Arranger: Masao Akashi / Singers: TUNE'SEpisode Range: 1–21 (SPECIAL 1 ending theme)
Lyricist: Daiko Nagato / Composer: Tetsurō Oda / Arranger: Takeshi Hayama / Singers: B.B.QueensEpisode Range: 22–57
Lyricist: Reo Rinozuka / Composer: Yasuo Kosugi / Arranger: Michiaki Kato / Singer: Shinnosuke Nohara (Akiko Yajima) and Misae Nohara (Miki Narahashi)Episode Range: SPECIAL 3–161 (First used as the opening theme for SPECIAL 2, and was used as the ending theme for episode 776)
Lyricist: Poem-dan / Composer/Arranger: Takashi Kimura / Singer: Shinnosuke Nohara (Akiko Yajima)Episode Range: 162–SPECIAL 13 (Also used as the opening theme for Crayon Shin-chan: Great Adventure in Henderland)
Lyricist: C's / Composer/Arranger: Satoru Sugawara / Singer: PuppyEpisode Range: 203–SPECIAL 20
Lyricist/Arranger/Composer: motsu / Singers: Shinnosuke Nohara (Akiko Yajima) and Action Mask (Tesshō Genda)Episode Range: 270–352
Lyricist/Composer: LADY Q / Arranger: Toshiya Mori / Singers: LADY Q and Shinnosuke Nohara (Akiko Yajima) and Misae Nohara (Miki Narahashi)Episode Range: 353–458
"PLEASURE"Lyricist: Chihiro Kurosu / Composer: Kaori Hosoi / Arranger: Nobuyuki Shimizu / Singer: Tomomi KahalaEpisode Range: 459–SPECIAL 43
Lyricist: Yuji Muto / Composer/Arranger: Yasunari Nakamura / Singer: Shinnosuke Nohara (Akiko Yajima)Episode Range: 509–594, 604–681
Lyricist: Yuji Muto / Composer: Yasunari Nakamura / Arranger: Takafumi Iwasaki / Singer: Shinnosuke Nohara (Akiko Yajima) and Crayon Friends from AKB48Episode Range: 595–603
Singer: Becky♪♯Episode Range: 682–708
"HEY BABY"Singer: Kumi KodaEpisode Range: 709–724
"T.W.L."Singer: Kanjani EightEpisode Range: 725–747
Kibou Sanmyaku (Hope Mountain Range)Singer: Watarirouka Hashiritai 7Episode Range: 748–SPECIAL 64
Kimi ni 100 PercentSinger: Kyary Pamyu PamyuEpisode Range: 784–937, 943–
Singer: Shinnosuke Nohara (Akiko Yajima) and Misae Nohara (Miki Narahashi)Episode Range: 938-942

Endings
Lyricist/Composer: Toshiyuki Arakawa / Arrangers/Singers: Daiji MAN Brothers BandEpisode Range: 1–21
Lyricist/Composer/Singer: Hiromi Yonemura / Arranger: Itaru WatanabeEpisode Range: 22–57
Lyricist: Yui Nishiwaki / Composer: Hideo Saito / Arranger: Hiroshi Shinkawa / Singers: Sakurakko Club Sakura GumiEpisode Range: SPECIAL 3–99
Lyricist: Moichi Kato / Composers/Arrangers: Ozutairiku and Yasuhiko Hoshino / Singers: Yuko and Shinnosuke Nohara (Akiko Yajima)Episode Range: 100–112
Lyricist: Marron Koshaku / Composer/Arranger: Takashi Kimura / Singers: Marron Koshaku and Shinnosuke Nohara (Akiko Yajima)Episode Range: 113–161
"REGGAE"Lyricist/Singer: KOTONE / Composers: KEISUKE and Yoichi Yamazaki / Arranger: Yuzo HayashiEpisode Range: 162–192
Lyricist: Moichi Kato / Composers: Ozutairiku and Yasuhiko Hoshino / Arrangers: Daisaku Kume and Kiyohiko Semba / Singers: Haruo Minami and Shinnosuke Nohara (Akiko Yajima)Episode Range: 193–SPECIAL 13
Lyricists: Aki Okui and Lemon Saito / Composer/Singer: Aki Okui / Arranger: Akitoshi OnoderaEpisode Range: 203–SPECIAL 17
Lyricist/Composer/Arranger: RYUZI / Singer: Nanase OgawaEpisode Range: 249–297
Lyricist/Composer: KAORU / Arrangers: Tsuyoshi Yamanaka and L'luvia / Singers: L'luviaEpisode Range: 298–352
Lyricist/Composer: Ke-chan / Singer: KamabokoEpisode Range: 353–397
Lyricist/Composer: Tsunku / Arrangers: Yuichi Takahashi and Tsunku / Singers: Sheki-DolEpisode Range: 398–SPECIAL 33
Lyricists: Yoshito Usui and Yuri Asada / Composer: Yasuo Kosugi / Arranger: Hideo Saito / Singers: Shinnosuke Nohara (Akiko Yajima) and Misae Nohara (Miki Narahashi)Episode Range: 452–SPECIAL 38・SPECIAL 43
Lyricist/Composer: Rio / Arranger: Papa Daisuke / Singers: YanawarabaaEpisode Range: 509–SPECIAL 46
Episode Range: 938–942

Vitello and Phuuz dubs

Opening
"Say hey! HEY! Shin-chan"

Closing
Say hey! HEY! Shin-chan" Instrumental

Funimation dub

Opening
"Shin-chan Theme"Shortened version of the third opening theme.

Closing
"Party Join Us"Singer: Brina PalenciaOriginally the fifth ending theme.

LUK Internacional dub

Opening
Footage from Japanese opening 8 ("PLEASURE") but with completely different lyrics, to the melody of a techno remix of Japanese opening 3 ("Ora wa Ninkimono").Musical Director, Producer and English Director: World Worm Studios composer Gary Gibbons

Closing
Footage from Japanese ending 3 ("DO-shite") and at the end (only in the first 11 episodes) Japanese opening 9 ("Yuruyuru de DE-O!") but with completely different lyrics to the melody of "DO-shite".Musical Director, Producer and English Director: World Worm Studios composer Gary Gibbons

Films

Video games

Console and handheld
Many video games were only released in Japan, but there were others released in South Korea, Italy and Spain.

Smartphone and tablet

Note: The last app isn't a game in itself, rather a Crayon Shin-chan hub with news, manga, and games.

Reception
As of 2015, the original run of the Crayon Shin-chan manga has sold over 55 million copies, while the New Crayon Shin-chan manga has sold over 3 million copies, surpassing 58 million copies between both, making it one of the best-selling manga series. Including game books, encyclopedic books and other related material, the figure amounts to 148 million. , Bandai Namco has sold  Crayon Shin-chan Chocobi food packs.

Controversies
A Hindi dub of the anime has aired on Hungama TV in India since June 19, 2006. There were complaints from parents over the main character's behavior and the attitudes exhibited towards elders on the show, both of which were seen as a negative influence on children. The series was banned in October 2008 by the Indian Ministry of Information and Broadcasting on account of heavy nudity.  After many requests from fans, a heavily edited version with the jokes edited to be more family-friendly started airing on Hungama TV from March 27, 2009.

A Portuguese dub of the anime has also aired on Biggs, with the segment of the 165th episode "Dad’s Hospitalized Life" causing major controversy in 2016, due to a scene where the nurses examine Shinnozuke's anus, and compliment it, all while he acts and looks uncomfortable. Due to complaints from parents, the Portuguese Media Regulatory Authority ordered that the show should only be aired after 10:30 PM. Eventually, the show was slowly faded out of Biggs' schedule, and from Portuguese television. Later, the show returned to television through Portugal's Fox Comedy, though on a limited run, with the show being removed from Fox Comedy Portugal after a few months.

References

Further reading

External links

Official Futabasha Crayon Shin-chan website 
Official TV Asahi Crayon Shin-chan website 
Official Bandai Visual Crayon Shin-chan website 
Official Shin-Ei Animation Crayon Shin-chan website 
Official Crayon Shin-chan movie website 
Official FUNimation Shin chan website
Official ComicsOne Crayon ShinChan website (Archive)

Crayon Shin-chan
1990 manga
1992 anime television series debuts
2010 manga
Japanese children's animated comedy television series
Japanese adult animated comedy television series
Crayon Shin-chan films
Japanese children's films
Children's animated films
Children's film series
Japanese adult animated films
Anime series based on manga
Asia Television
Bandai Visual
CMX (comics) titles
Comedy anime and manga
ComicsOne titles
Funimation
Futabasha manga
Manga adapted into films
Japanese-language television shows
Seinen manga
Shin-Ei Animation
Animated children's television sitcoms
Animated adult television sitcoms
Slice of life anime and manga
TV Asahi original programming
Saitama Prefecture in fiction